Earl is the debut mixtape by American rapper Earl Sweatshirt. It was released as a free digital download on March 31, 2010, on the Odd Future website.

Background and lyrics
Earl is notable for its depraved and violent lyrics, which detail the fictional misadventures of the young Earl Sweatshirt, as he commits acts of murder, rape, kidnapping, and violence. The album features production by BrandenBeatBoy (credited as BeatBoy) and fellow Odd Future members Tyler, the Creator and Left Brain. The album features vocals from Tyler, the Creator, Vince Staples, Hodgy Beats, and some backing vocals from fellow Odd Future members Syd Tha Kyd and Taco Bennett. The lyrics featured on the album were written and recorded in 2009–2010, when Earl was 15–16 years old. The content present throughout the album includes various drug references, macabre themes of murder, rape and sexual lyrics.

On the title track, Earl, Tyler, and Taco rap about their distaste for 2DOPEBOYZ over frustrations the blog wouldn't publish Odd Future's music.

Reception

Pitchfork Media called the album "mesmerizing". Pitchfork's sister site Altered Zones listed Earl as one of their top twenty albums of 2010, praising the album for its ferocity and for making "some of the most vile verses sound eloquent". Music site Gorilla vs. Bear listed it at number 12 in its list of the 30 best albums of 2010.
Complex magazine rated Earl as the twenty-fourth best album of 2010.

Accolades
The mixtape was recognized as one of The 100 Best Albums of the Decade So Far, a list published by Pitchfork Media in August 2014.

Track listing 

 Notes
 "Thisniggaugly" and "Earl" feature additional vocals from Tyler, the Creator and Taco.
 "Wakeupfaggot" features additional vocals from Syd tha Kyd.
 "epaR" features additional vocals from Hodgy Beats.
 Tyler, the Creator is credited as 'Ace Creator' on "Couch," and as 'Wolf Haley' on "Pigions."

Unauthorized Tidal & Amazon Music re-release 
On April 6, 2015, Earl was re-released on music streaming services Tidal and Amazon Music. The updated track list combined most of the original tracks from Earl (excluding "Thisniggaugly" and "Wakeupfaggot") with tracks recorded prior to Earl, back when Sweatshirt went by the stage name Sly Tendencies. Other tracks include songs Sweatshirt featured on around the time of Earl. This is an unauthorized release from the company Classic Hits. Despite being available for purchase, most included songs were previously released for free.

Track listing 

Notes
 The instrumental for "Deerskin" is originally the instrumental for "All Caps" by Madvillain, produced by Madlib.
 The instrumental for "Orange Juice" is originally the instrumental for "Lemonade" by Gucci Mane, produced by Bangladesh.
 Hodgy Beats was mistakenly credited on the re-release's track list; Tyler, the Creator is the correct feature.
 "Chordaroy" was originally on MellowHype's 2010 mixtape BlackenedWhite.
 The instrumental for "Drop" is originally the instrumental for "Drop" by Rich Boy, produced by Cha Lo and Polow da Don.
 The instrumental for "Swag Me Out" is originally the instrumental for "Not a Stain on Me" by Big Tuck.
 "Home" was released as a standalone song on February 8, 2012, the day Sweatshirt returned from Samoa, and the instrumental for it is originally the song "Theme From Paris" by James Pants.
 The instrumental for "Blade" is originally the instrumental for "Nothing's Gonna Stop Me" by Terror Squad, produced by DJ Khaled.
 "Rick James" was mistakenly released as an Earl Sweatshirt song. The song is actually titled "BADBOI222" and was released by Long Island rapper "BIG BREAKFAST".

References 

2010 mixtape albums
Earl Sweatshirt albums
Albums produced by Tyler, the Creator
Albums produced by Left Brain
Rape in fiction
Rap operas
Concept albums
Horrorcore albums
Self-released albums